State Highway 104, abbreviated SH-104 or OK-104, is a short state highway in the U.S. state of Oklahoma. It has no lettered spur routes.

State Highway 104 was established in its current form in 1955.

Route description
State Highway 104 begins in Haskell at an intersection with US-64/SH-72. SH-104 heads eastward from here, crossing the Arkansas River at a slight angle (and crossing from Muskogee into Wagoner county while doing so). It then turns north, then east, before turning north again along 317th East Avenue. It passes through unincorporated Choska on this avenue. One mile (1.6 km) north of Choska, the highway turns east on E. 221st St, which it follows for another mile. SH-104 then turns back to the north along 333rd E. Avenue. It ends at SH-51B at the incorporated place of Stones Corner, southwest of Red Bird.

History
SH-104 was commissioned in its present form on May 2, 1955. The only change to the route was to transfer it to a new Arkansas River bridge, which occurred July 12, 1982. No further changes have occurred since.

Junction list

References

External links

SH-104 at OKHighways

104
Transportation in Muskogee County, Oklahoma
Transportation in Wagoner County, Oklahoma